Mariona Ribas i Deu (born June 18, 1984 in Sabadell, Catalonia) is a Spanish actress.

Ribas received a musical education and studied dance and acting before her debut on television at the age of 15. On the stage, Ribas made her debut with a starring role in Manuel Veiga's Tempesta de neu at Sala Muntaner, Barcelona, in 2003. Ribas also had a leading role in Ja en tinc 30!, in 2004. She has also played a role in Jugando con Molière (2005–2006) and El poema de Nadal (2007).

Ribas is a well-known face in her native Catalonia due to the popularity of the long-running Catalan soap opera El Cor de la Ciutat, where she starred as Marta, specially during the first 5 seasons.

Filmography

References

External links

1984 births
Living people
Television actresses from Catalonia
20th-century Spanish actresses